Dominic McMullan (born 1962 in Loughguile, County Antrim) is an Irish retired sportsperson.  He played hurling with his local club Loughgiel Shamrocks and was a member of the Antrim senior inter-county team in the 1980s and 1990s.

References

1962 births
Living people
Loughgiel Shamrocks hurlers
Antrim inter-county hurlers
Ulster inter-provincial hurlers